The Beijing Hospital of Traditional Chinese Medicine is a largest Chinese Medicine hospital is network headquartered in the region of Beijing, China. The hospital network has approximately 2,500 beds and has three institute and centers, the Institute of Traditional Chinese Medicine, Zhao Bingnan's Medical Center of Dermatosis, Beijing International Training Center for Acupuncture as well as an additional 26 clinical departments.

The hospital network is listed as one of the largest hospital networks in the world in terms of available beds. Its flagship location is the Capital Medical University Beijing Hospital of Traditional Chinese Medicine located on 23 Meishuguan Back St in Beijing.

History
The hospital network was founded in 1956 focusing on Traditional Chinese medicine (TCM). The hospital uses TCM to treat diseases "of the spleen and stomach, cough, asthma, insomnia, diabetes, enuresis, chronic fatigue syndrome, facial paralysis, protrusion of lumbar intervertebral disc, sciatica, dysmenorrhea, acne, and fatty liver".

Beijing International Acupuncture Training Center, a subsidiary of Beijing Hospital of Traditional Chinese Medicine, has been visited and studied by roughly 30,000 people from over 80 countries.

In 2017, president of the Beijing Hospital of Traditional Chinese Medicine, Liu Quanqing, warned against using "anti-smog" herbal teas to combat smog related illness stating it is ineffective and "may even cause additional health risks". Liu warned that "anti-smog" tea contained "ingredients that are medicines and can't be used as food, which may cause health problems if taken for a long time". He also "suggested remedies for cleaning the lungs, such as eating kelp, radish or wood-ear fungus" were not genuine.

A joint venture involving Beijing Hospital of Traditional Chinese Medicine set up Ming Yi Guan, the first "treatment facility outside China".

See also
 Beijing University of Chinese Medicine

References

External links

Hospitals in Beijing
Buildings and structures in Beijing
1956 establishments in China